Carlos Santana Becerra (1908 – March 11, 1971) served for over 13 years as an Associate Justice of the Puerto Rico Supreme Court.

Born in Manatí, Puerto Rico, he obtained his bachelors and law degrees at the University of Puerto Rico.  While a student, he was active in student politics.

Admitted to the bar in 1934, he served in various public offices, before joining the United States Army in 1943 during World War II.  After his honorable discharge, he continued serving in government, including the Solicitor General's office as well as a Superior Court Judge from 1952 to 1957, when Governor Luis Muñoz Marín appointed him to the Supreme Court.

He retired on February 15, 1971 at the age of 62, shortly before his death in San Juan, Puerto Rico on March 11. He was buried at Santa María Magdalena de Pazzis Cemetery in San Juan, Puerto Rico. His vacancy was filled by Associate Justice Angel Martín.

Sources 
La Justicia en sus Manos by Luis Rafael Rivera, 

1908 births
1971 deaths
Burials at Santa María Magdalena de Pazzis Cemetery
People from Manatí, Puerto Rico
Associate Justices of the Supreme Court of Puerto Rico
Puerto Rican lawyers
20th-century Puerto Rican lawyers
20th-century American judges